Cheiramiona is a genus of spiders in the family Cheiracanthiidae. It was first described in 1999 by Lotz & Dippenaar-Schoeman. , it contains 50 species, all from Africa.

Species

Cheiramiona comprises the following species:
Cheiramiona akermani (Lawrence, 1942)
Cheiramiona amarifontis Lotz, 2003
Cheiramiona ansiae Lotz, 2003
Cheiramiona baviaan Lotz, 2015
Cheiramiona boschrandensis Lotz, 2015
Cheiramiona brandbergensis Lotz, 2005
Cheiramiona clavigera (Simon, 1897)
Cheiramiona collinita (Lawrence, 1938)
Cheiramiona debeeri Lotz, 2015
Cheiramiona dubia (O. Pickard-Cambridge, 1874)
Cheiramiona ferrumfontis Lotz, 2003
Cheiramiona filipes (Simon, 1898)
Cheiramiona florisbadensis Lotz, 2003
Cheiramiona fontanus Lotz, 2003
Cheiramiona haddadi Lotz, 2015
Cheiramiona hewitti (Lessert, 1921)
Cheiramiona hlathikulu Lotz, 2015
Cheiramiona hogsbackensis Lotz, 2015
Cheiramiona ibayaensis Lotz, 2015
Cheiramiona jakobsbaaiensis Lotz, 2015
Cheiramiona jocquei Lotz, 2003
Cheiramiona kalongensis Lotz, 2003
Cheiramiona kentaniensis Lotz, 2003
Cheiramiona kirkspriggsi Lotz, 2015
Cheiramiona kivuensis Lotz, 2015
Cheiramiona krugerensis Lotz, 2003
Cheiramiona lajuma Lotz, 2003
Cheiramiona lamorali Lotz, 2015
Cheiramiona langi Lotz, 2003
Cheiramiona lejeuni Lotz, 2003
Cheiramiona lindae Lotz, 2015
Cheiramiona malawiensis Lotz, 2015
Cheiramiona mkhambathi Lotz, 2015
Cheiramiona mlawula Lotz, 2003
Cheiramiona mohalensis Lotz, 2015
Cheiramiona musosaensis Lotz, 2015
Cheiramiona muvalensis Lotz, 2003
Cheiramiona nyungwensis Lotz, 2015
Cheiramiona paradisus Lotz, 2003
Cheiramiona plaatbosensis Lotz, 2015
Cheiramiona qachasneki Lotz, 2015
Cheiramiona regis Lotz, 2003
Cheiramiona robinae Lotz, 2015
Cheiramiona ruwenzoricola (Strand, 1916)
Cheiramiona saniensis Lotz, 2015
Cheiramiona silvicola (Lawrence, 1938)
Cheiramiona simplicitarsis (Simon, 1910)
Cheiramiona stellenboschiensis Lotz, 2003
Cheiramiona tembensis Lotz, 2015
Cheiramiona upperbyensis Lotz, 2015

References

Araneomorphae genera
Spiders of Africa
Cheiracanthiidae